Mycobiota (plural noun, no singular) are a group of all the fungi present in a particular geographic region (e.g. "the mycobiota of Ireland") or habitat type (e.g. "the mycobiota of cocoa").

Human mycobiota
Mycobiota exist on the surface and in the gastrointestinal system of humans. There are as many as sixty-six genera and 184 species in the gastrointestinal tract of healthy people. Most of these are in the Candida genera.

Though found to be present on the skin and in the gi tract in healthy individuals, the normal resident mycobiota can become pathogenic in those who are immunocompromized. Such multispecies infections lead to higher mortalities.  In addition hospital-acquired infections by C. albicans have become a cause of major health concerns. A high mortality rate of 40-60% is associated with systemic infection. The best-studied of these are Candida species due to their ability to become pathogenic in immunocompromised and even in healthy hosts. Yeasts are also present on the skin, such as Malassezia species, where they consume oils secreted from the sebaceous glands. Pityrosporum (Malassezia) ovale, which is lipid-dependent and found only on humans. P. ovale was later divided into two species, P. ovale and P. orbiculare, but current sources consider these terms to refer to a single species of fungus, with M. furfur the preferred name.

Other uses
There is a peer reviewed mycological journal titled Mycobiota.

References

Fungus ecology
Aquatic ecology
Biology terminology
Microbiomes